Libertarianism in South Africa has influenced political and apolitical structures. While libertarianism has not yet become a distinct political movement, it is instead represented in one form or another in multiple political and non-political organisations. Such libertarianism can either refer to a political movement synonymous with anarchism, left-libertarianism and libertarian socialism, or to a political movement concerned with the pursuit of propertarian right-libertarian ideals which emerged in the 1970s with the rise of neoliberalism.

History 
Left-libertarianism in South Africa dates to the 1880s and played a major role in the labour and socialist movements from the turn of the 20th century through to the 1920s. The early South African libertarian movement was strongly anarchist and syndicalist. The ascendance of Marxism–Leninism following the Russian Revolution, along with state repression, resulted in most of the movement going over to the Comintern line, with the remainder consigned to irrelevance. There were slight traces of anarchist or syndicalist influence in some of the independent left-wing groups which resisted the apartheid government from the 1970s onward, but as a distinct movement they only began re-emerging in South Africa in the early 1990s. It remains a minority current in South African politics.

Right-libertarianism in South Africa dates back to the mid-1970s when Leon Louw, Marc Swanepoel and several others got together informally to discuss this new philosophy. One result of this cooperation was the formation of the Free Market Foundation in 1975, identified by many as being a free-market libertarian think-tank. Regular weekly meetings were held at Louw's house in Dunkeld to which an enthusiastic group of early libertarians were invited. Leon's wife Frances Kendall published a monthly magazine called The Individualist which was circulated around the group.

In 1986, Leon Louw and Francis Kendall published a work entitled "South Africa the Solution". This led to the formation of the Groundswell movement which was active prior to the 1994 general election. Trevor Watkins, Claire Emary and Charl Heydenrych formed the KISS party prior to the 1994 elections which then resulted in the formation of the Federal Party led by Francis Kendall. In 2013, Barry de Harde, Charl Heydenrych, Trevor Watkins and Enyinna Nkem-abonta got together to form the Libertarian Party of South Africa which was inaugurated at the 2013 Seminar in Prince Albert. The Libertarian Party was registered as a formal political party in 2014, but it did not contest the 2014 general elections due to the high cost of participation and is currently inactive.

Also in 1986, Trevor Watkins formed the Libertarian Society as a means of maintaining a database of known libertarians in the country. Over the years, the Libertarian Society has added websites, email groups and blogs and organised monthly dinners in Johannesburg and Cape Town and Durban. The Libertarian Society was also involved in organising many annual seminars. Two young libertarians, Nicholas Woode-Smith (a committee member of the Libertarian Party) and Martin van Staden, formed various alternative libertarian groupings, including the Rational Standard blog.

Libertarian seminars 
In 1985, a subscriber to The Individualist named Ria Crafford suggested that a seminar be held at which libertarians from all over the country could gather. This led to the first libertarian spring seminar being held on the farm Nebo near Ficksburg in the Orange Free State in 1985. Following the success of this seminar, Trevor Watkins, Charl Heydenrych and Peter Kidson organised the second Seminar at Mont-aux-Sources hotel in the Drakensberg. A libertarian spring seminar has been held every year since that time with the single exception of 2010. The date is commonly late September or October (spring in South Africa), the venue is often close to mountains (the central parts of the country are more accessible to more people) and the target audience is all known South African libertarians, with a smattering of overseas intellectuals.

Organisations 
The following table provides links to and descriptions of most libertarian-leaning organisations in South Africa.

See also 

 Alan Paton
 Libertarianism in the United Kingdom
 Libertarianism in the United States
 South African Liberal Party

References

External links 
 Richard Bartholomew (2 February 2008). "The Libertarian Right and Southern Africa in the 1980s: Some Brief Notes". Bartholomew's Notes. Retrieved 26 March 2019.
 Libertarian Society of South Africa on WordPress.
 Libertarian Party of South Africa website.
 Free Market Foundation website.

South Africa
South Africa
Liberalism in South Africa
Political movements in South Africa